Macdonald was a federal electoral district in Manitoba, Canada, that was represented in the House of Commons of Canada from 1892 to 1949.

This riding was created in 1892 from parts of Marquette ridings.

It was abolished in 1947 when it was redistributed into Brandon, Lisgar, Portage—Neepawa, Selkirk and Souris ridings.

It consisted of the rural municipalities of South Cypress, South Norfolk, North Norfolk, North Cypress, Langford, Rosedale, Lansdowne, Westbourne and Portage la Prairie, and the towns of Portage la Prairie, Gladstone and Neepawa, and the village of Carberry, together with some unorganised territory lying west of  Lake Manitoba and north to the northern boundary of the province of Manitoba.

Election results

By-election: On election being declared void, 30 March 1897

By-election: On Mr. Staples being appointed Grain Commissioner for Canada, 10 April 1912

By-election: On election being declared void, 10 November 1913

See also 

 List of Canadian federal electoral districts
 Past Canadian electoral districts

External links 

Former federal electoral districts of Manitoba